The Ford Sidevalve is a side valve (flathead engine) from the British arm of the Ford Motor Company, often also referred to as the "English Sidevalve". The early engines did not have a water pump as standard, instead relying on thermosiphon cooling as the Model T engine had. A water pump was added in 1953 for the 100E models when the engine was re-engineered to the point that few specifications are identical between the early and the later series. The Sidevalve engine was used in many smaller Fords as well as farm vehicles, commercial vehicles and a marine version in boats. Production of the engine was stopped in 1962. Windscreen wipers were often driven by the vacuum generated in the inlet manifold.

The Sidevalve Engine was also used in German Fords, starting with the Ford Köln in 1932 and ending with the last rear-wheel drive Ford Taunus 12M (G13/G13AL) in 1962. Only the 1172cc version originally invented for the English Ford "10 HP" was used in the german Ford lines. Early further research and development were being carried out at the german Ford engine plant in Cologne to improve the engine for ease of use in the Taunus line of cars but this work was finally halted in 1942. 

It was replaced by the Kent engine in Britain and by the Taunus V4 engine in Germany.

Engine modifications
Many ways were explored to enhance the power output of the standard engine, most notably special exhaust manifolds, twin carburettors, stiffer valve springs, thinner cylinder head gaskets and modified camshafts.

Power rating 
The nominal horsepower quoted for each engine size comes from the British method of power calculation for road taxation purposes, and bears no relationship with the actual power output. Displacement, cylinder diameter, stroke, and number of cylinders determined the power for road taxation purposes.

Gearbox & transmission
A three-speed gearbox was fitted as standard; three forward and one reverse. Several ways of improving the performance through modifications to the gearbox and transmission train were applied; replacement close ratio gears fitted to gearbox, overdrive gears fitted behind the original gearbox and higher ratio crown & pinion gears fitted to the differential unit on the back axle.

Applications

Ford cars 
Ford Model Y (1932–1937)
Ford Model C (1934-1937)
Ford 7W (1937-1938)
Ford 7Y (1937–1939)
Ford Anglia E04A, E494A (1939–1953)
Ford Prefect E93A, E493A (1938–1953)
Ford Popular 103e (1953–1959)
100E series
Ford Prefect (1953–1959)
Ford Anglia (1953–1959)
Ford Squire (1955–1959)
Ford Escort (1955-1961)
Ford Popular (1959-1962)
Ford Köln (1932–1935)
Ford Eifel (1935–1939)
Ford Taunus G93A (1939–1951)
Ford Taunus 12M first generation (1952–1959)
Ford Taunus 12M second generation (1959–1962)

Other makers or models 

Ashley
Autobee Pacemaker
Buckler for their lightweight sports kitcars for road use and rallies, trials, hillclimbs or racing.
Concordette
Convair
Dellow
Fairthorpe Electron
Falcon
Caribbean
Bermuda
Ginetta Cars
G2
G3 (aka Fairlite)
Gregory
Hud

Lotus
Mk2
Mk4
6
7 S1
Martin
Mazengrabs
Morgan
F4
4/4 Series II
F4/F2
F Super
Naco Estate
Nota

Paramount
Rochdale 
C-type
F-type
MkVI
ST
GT
Riviera
Shirley
Speedex Sirocco GT
Streamliner
TVR 
Grantura I
Tornado 
Typhoon
Cannon 
Trials Car

Ancillary equipment, designers & other related information 
Aquaplane, manufacturer of dedicated exhaust and inlet manifolds for the Ford sidevalve engine, also aluminium alloy cylinder heads etc.
Leslie Ballamy, designer of split front suspension used on many Ford "specials"
Buckler Cars manufactured 1172 Formula racing cars using a space frame chassis and the 4 cylinder English Ford Sidevalve engine and other Buckler sporting cars using similar equipment. Manufacturer of close-ratio gears, special axle ratios, and all types of engine tuning equipment for the 4 cylinder sidevalve engines.
Willment in the UK, designed and manufactured overhead inlet valve cylinder heads for the side valve engines. 
Elva Engineering in the U.K. designed and manufactured overhead inlet valve conversion cylinder heads for this sidevalve engine, also complete sports/racing cars and other tuning parts.

External links 
 Ford Sidevalve Owners Club

Bibliography 
 Cars and Car Conversions, "Tuning SU Carburettors", Speed and Sports Publications Ltd, (1968).
 G B Wake, "Ford Special Builders Manual", J H Haynes & Co Ltd.
 Philip H. Smith, "The Ford Ten Competition Engine", G T Foulis & Co. Ltd. A complete tuning manual. 
 John Haynes, "Building a Ford 10 Special", Auto Publications, London.
 John Mills, "The Constructions of Ford Specials", B T Batsford, London.
 Bill Cooper, "Tuning Side-Valve Fords", Speed and Sports Publications Ltd, (1969).
 Miriam Nyhan, "Are You Still Below", The Collins Press, (2007) - The Ford Marina Plant, Cork, 1917-1984. 
 Ford Motor Company, "Anglia-Prefect Repair Manual"
 Dave Turner, "Ford Popular and the Small Sidevalves", Osprey Publishing Ltd, (1984). 
 Bill Ballard, "English & Australian Small Fords", Ellery Publications, (2002). 

Sidevalve
Gasoline engines by model
Straight-four engines